The 1977 Canadian Grand Prix was a Formula One motor race held on October 9, 1977, at Mosport Park. It was the 16th and penultimate race of the 1977 Formula One season.

Report

In qualifying, Lotus's Mario Andretti took his sixth pole position of the season, with McLaren's James Hunt alongside him on the front row. Ronnie Peterson was third in his six-wheeled Tyrrell, ahead of Gunnar Nilsson in the second Lotus. The top ten was completed by Jochen Mass in the second McLaren, Patrick Depailler in the second Tyrrell, the Shadows of Alan Jones and Riccardo Patrese, Jody Scheckter in the Wolf, and John Watson in the Brabham. But the safety of the bumpy, high-speed Mosport Park track was in question: during practice Ian Ashley's Hesketh crested one of these bumps on the Mario Andretti straight; it flipped, vaulted the barrier and crashed into a television tower, seriously injuring Ashley and ending his Formula One career. The Englishman survived, but it took 40 minutes to remove him from the car and an additional 30 minutes passed until a helicopter arrived. These problems were underlined later that day when Mass crashed at the first corner into a barrier that flattened upon impact.

At the start of the race, Andretti led away from Hunt, with Mass charging up to third. Andretti and Hunt then proceeded to pull away from the rest of the field, such that by three-quarter distance, they were coming up to lap third-placed Mass. As they did so, Hunt pulled ahead of Andretti, only to collide with his McLaren team-mate after a misunderstanding. Unable to continue, a visibly furious and agitated Hunt waved his fist at Mass, before punching a marshal who was trying to usher him away. He was subsequently fined $2000 for assaulting a marshal and $750 for walking back to the pit lane in an "unsafe manner".. Gilles Villeneuve made his debut with Ferrari at this race and started seventeenth after a qualifying crash leading into Moss corner. He had risen to eighth place before spinning in Moss corner on lap 72, dropping back to tenth.

There was drama in the final four laps. On lap 77, Andretti's engine blew and laid oil in turn 9 as he pulled into the pits. Patrese spun his Shadow in the turn 9 oil and into the second Hesketh of Rupert Keegan, which had crashed earlier in the race and had been left on the side of the track.  Vittorio Brambilla then hit the oil and also spun his Surtees, collecting the wreckages of Keegan's and Patrese's cars. Danny Ongais was next in the Interscope Penske, but was able to continue. Finally Villeneuve spun, staying on the track only to break a driveshaft trying to pull away and retiring. 

Andretti's retirement meant that Scheckter inherited the win, with Depailler second and the recovered Mass completing the podium. Jones was fourth ahead of Patrick Tambay in the Ensign, while Brambilla was classified sixth, just ahead of Ongais.

Classification

Qualifying classification

Race classification

Championship standings after the race

Drivers' Championship standings

Constructors' Championship standings

 Note: Only the top five positions are included for both sets of standings. Only the best 8 results from the first 9 races and the best 7 results from the remaining 8 races were retained. Numbers without parentheses are retained points; numbers in parentheses are total points scored.

References

Canadian Grand Prix
Canadian Grand Prix
1977 in Canadian motorsport
Grand Prix